Chadoora is a town and a Municipal committee in Budgam district in Indian administered  union territory of Jammu and Kashmir. Famous sofi and aa'lim Mir Shams-ud-Din Araqi is buried here.

Location
Chadoora is a big town, and under this tehsil, there are more than one hundred villages such as Bagh Buchroo, Zoohama, Ranger, Sursyar, Dadaompora, Hanjora, Sogam, Bogam, Gundi Maqsood, Batpora, Lolipora, Daulatpur, Panzan, Porwar to name a few.

The other nearest localities include Bulbulpora, Hussipora, Gopalpora, Dooniwari, Wathora, Kralpora, Bagati Kani Pora.

The pincode is 191113.

Population
According to the 2011 census Chadoora Tehsil has the total population of 212233 out of which 113529 are male and 98704 are females.

References

Cities and towns in Budgam district